Alive is the second album by Chinese folk singer Sa Dingding, released in 2007.

On Alive, Sa Dingding sings in Mandarin Chinese, Sanskrit, Standard Tibetan, the nearly extinct Laghu language and an imaginary self-created language to evoke the emotions in her songs.

Track listing

DVD Track listing 

Available on the Hong Kong release only.

 "Mama Tian Na (Chinese version)" MV
 "Mama Tian Na (Mantra)" MV
 "Alive (Chinese Version)" MV
 "Alive (Vajrasattva Mantra)" MV
 "Alive" Making Of MV
 "Alive (Dispop Remix)" [audio]

Track listing (Japanese release)

Album credits 

 "Mama Tian Na (Tibet Version)"
 Lyrics: Qi Qing Shang Shi
 Composer: Sa Dingding, Huang Yi
 Arranger: Huang Yi, Sa Dingding
 "Alive (Mantra)"
 Lyrics: Jin Gang Sa Duo Bai Zi Ming Zhou
 Composer: Sa Dingding, Huang Yi
 Arranger: Huang Yi, Sa Dingding
 Guzheng: Name Unknown
 Bass: Wang Xiaodong
 Guitars: Yang Jianfeng
 Background vocals: Huang Yi
 "Holy Incense (Tibet Version)"
 Lyrics: He Xuntian
 Composer: He Xuntian
 Arranger: He Xuntian
 Production assistant: Ge Yi Qian
 Bamboo flute: Tang Jun Qiao
 Percussion: Su Ma
 Male vocal: Huo Yonggang
 Chorus: Zatu Vocal Ensemble
 "Oldster by Xilin River (Self-created Language)"
 Lyrics: Sa Ding DIng
 Composer: Zhang Hongguang
 Arranger: Ma Li
 Horse-head fiddle: Si Ri Gu Leng
 "Tuo Luo Ni (Sanskrit)"
 Lyrics: Bao Qie Yin Tuo Luo Ni
 Composer: Sa Dingding
 Arranger: Huang Yi, Sa Dingding
 "Lagu Lagu (Self-created Language)"
 Lyrics: Sa Dingding
 Composer: Zhang Hongguang
 Arranger: Ma Li, Peng Bo
 "Flickering With Blossoms (Chinese version)"
 Lyrics: Xiang Die
 Composer: Sa Dingding
 Arranger: Ma Li
 "Holy Incense (Chinese version)"
 Lyrics: He Xuntian
 Composer: He Xuntian
 Arranger: He Xuntian
 Production assistant: Ge Yi Qian
 Bamboo flute: Tang Jun Qiao
 Percussion: Su Ma
 Chorus: Zatu Vocal Ensemble
 "Alive  (Chinese version)"
 Lyrics: Gao Xiao Song
 Composer: Sa Dingding, Huang Yi
 Arranger: Huang Yi, Sa Dingding
 Bass: Wang Xiaodong
 Guitars: Yang Jianfeng
 "Qin Shang (Chinese version)"
 Lyrics: Sa Dingding
 Composer: Sa Dingding
 Arranger: Peng Bo
 Keyboard: Peng Bo

References 

2007 albums
Sa Dingding albums